Abbey College is a secondary school located in Ramsey, Cambridgeshire, England. The school is around 10 miles from Huntingdon and Peterborough and offers education for 11-18 year olds in its surroundings town / areas. 1011 students attend the school (capacity only at 1250). In 2020 the school appeared in the local news due to teachers at Abbey College attaching head and shoulder photographs of more than 110 sixth-form students a board now named the "shame board" by students due to its ranking of "effort and progress into work".

History
In 2006, Ailwyn Community College and Ramsey Abbey School joined into a single school, Abbey college. The building had been active for centuries before the school had even been founded due to being a monastery founded by monks, whereas The Ailwyn was founded in the 1950s.

On 1 September 2011, the school officially gained academy status. Also in 2011, the school was labelled by Ofsted as "A good school with outstanding features". In both 2014 & 2016, it was labelled as "Requires Improvement." In 2018, the school re-obtained the status of "Good" from Ofsted.

More information about the Abbey here: Ramsey Abbey

References

External links
 Official website

Educational institutions established in 2006
Academies in Cambridgeshire
Edward Blore buildings
2006 establishments in England
Secondary schools in Cambridgeshire
Grade I listed buildings in Cambridgeshire
Ramsey, Cambridgeshire